Comparative law is the study of differences and similarities between the law (legal systems) of different countries. More specifically, it involves the study of the different legal "systems" (or "families") in existence in the world, including the common law, the civil law, socialist law, Canon law, Jewish Law, Islamic law, Hindu law, and Chinese law. It includes the description and analysis of foreign legal systems, even where no explicit comparison is undertaken. The importance of comparative law has increased enormously in the present age of internationalism, economic globalization, and democratization.

History
The origins of modern Comparative Law can be traced back to Gottfried Wilhelm Leibniz in 1667 in his Latin-language book Nova Methodus Discendae Docendaeque Iurisprudentiae (New Methods of Studying and Teaching Jurisprudence). Chapter 7 (Presentation of Law as the Project for all Nations, Lands and Times) introduces the idea of classifying Legal Systems into several families. Notably, a few years later, Leibniz introduced an idea of Language families.

Although every Legal System is unique, Comparative Law through studies of their similarities and differences allows for classification of Legal Systems, wherein Law Families is the basic level of the classification. The main differences between Law Families are found in the source(s) of Law, the role of court precedents, the origin and development of the Legal System. Montesquieu is generally regarded as an early founding figure of comparative law. His comparative approach is obvious in the following excerpt from Chapter III of Book I of his masterpiece, De l'esprit des lois (1748; first translated by Thomas Nugent, 1750):

Also, in Chapter XI (entitled 'How to compare two different Systems of Laws') of Book XXIX, discussing the French and English systems for punishment of false witnesses, he advises that "to determine which of those systems is most agreeable to reason, we must take them each as a whole and compare them in their entirety." Yet another place where Montesquieu's comparative approach is evident is the following, from Chapter XIII of Book XXIX:

The modern founding figure of comparative and anthropological jurisprudence was Sir Henry Maine, a British jurist and legal historian. In his 1861 work Ancient Law: Its Connection with the Early History of Society, and Its Relation to Modern Ideas, he set out his views on the development of legal institutions in primitive societies and engaged in a comparative discussion of Eastern and Western legal traditions. This work placed comparative law in its historical context and was widely read and influential.

The first university course on the subject was established at the University of Oxford in 1869, with Maine taking up the position of professor.

Comparative law in the US was brought by a legal scholar fleeing persecution in Germany, Rudolf Schlesinger. Schlesinger eventually became professor of comparative law at Cornell Law School helping to spread the discipline throughout the US.

Purpose
Comparative law is an academic discipline that involves the study of legal systems, including their constitutive elements and how they differ, and how their elements combine into a system.

Several disciplines have developed as separate branches of comparative law, including comparative constitutional law, comparative administrative law, comparative civil law (in the sense of the law of torts, contracts, property and obligations), comparative commercial law (in the sense of business organisations and trade), and comparative criminal law. Studies of these specific areas may be viewed as micro- or macro-comparative legal analysis, i.e. detailed comparisons of two countries, or broad-ranging studies of several countries. Comparative civil law studies, for instance, show how the law of private relations is organised, interpreted and used in different systems or countries. The purposes of comparative law are:
 To attain a deeper knowledge of the legal systems in effect
 To perfect the legal systems in effect
 Possibly, to contribute to a unification of legal systems, of a smaller or larger scale (cf. for instance, the UNIDROIT initiative)

Relationship with other legal subjects
Comparative law is different from general jurisprudence (i.e. legal theory) and from public and private international law. However, it helps inform all of these areas of normativity.

For example, comparative law can help international legal institutions, such as those of the United Nations System, in analyzing the laws of different countries regarding their treaty obligations. Comparative law would be applicable to private international law when developing an approach to interpretation in a conflicts analysis. Comparative law may contribute to legal theory by creating categories and concepts of general application. Comparative law may also provide insights into the question of legal transplants, i.e. the transplanting of law and legal institutions from one system to another. The notion of legal transplants was coined by Alan Watson, one of the world's renowned legal scholars specializing in comparative law.

Also, the usefulness of comparative law for sociology of law and law and economics (and vice versa) is very large. The comparative study of the various legal systems may show how different legal regulations for the same problem function in practice. Conversely, sociology of law and law & economics may help comparative law answer questions, such as: 
 How do regulations in different legal systems really function in the respective societies? 
 Are legal rules comparable? 
 How do the similarities and differences between legal systems get explained?

Classifications of legal systems

David
René David proposed the classification of legal systems, according to the different ideology inspiring each one, into five groups or families:
 Western laws, a group subdivided into the:
 Civil law subgroup (whose jurisprudence is based on post-classical Roman Law)
 Common law subgroup (originating in English law)
 Soviet Law
 Muslim Law
 Hindu Law
 Chinese Law
 Jewish Law

Especially with respect to the aggregating by David of the Civil and Common laws into a single family, David argued that the antithesis between the Common law and Civil law systems, is of a technical rather than of an ideological nature. Of a different kind is, for instance, the antithesis between, say, Italian and American laws, and of a different kind than between the Soviet, Muslim, Hindu, or Chinese laws. According to David, the Civil law legal systems included those countries where legal science was formulated according to Roman law, whereas Common law countries are those dominated by judge-made law. The characteristics that he believed uniquely differentiate the Western legal family from the other four are:
 liberal democracy
 capitalist economy
 Christian religion

Arminjon, Nolde, and Wolff
Arminjon, Nolde, and Wolff believed that, for purposes of classifying the (then) contemporary legal systems of the world, it was required that those systems per se get studied, irrespective of external factors, such as geographical ones. They proposed the classification of legal system into seven groups, or so-called 'families', in particular the:

 French group, under which they also included the countries that codified their law either in 19th or in the first half of the 20th century, using the Napoleonic code civil of year 1804 as a model; this includes countries and jurisdictions such as Italy, Portugal, Spain, Romania, Louisiana, various South American states such as Brazil, Quebec, Saint Lucia, the Ionian Islands, Egypt, and Lebanon
 German group
 Scandinavian group, comprising the laws of Denmark, Norway, Sweden, Finland, and Iceland
 English group, including, inter alia, England, the United States, Canada, Australia, and New Zealand
 Russian group
 Islamic group (used in the Muslim world)
 Hindu group

Zweigert and Kötz
Konrad Zweigert and Hein Kötz propose a different, multidimensional methodology for categorizing laws, i.e. for ordering families of laws. They maintain that, to determine such families, five criteria should be taken into account, in particular: the historical background, the characteristic way of thought, the different institutions, the recognized sources of law, and the dominant ideology. Using the aforementioned criteria, they classify the legal systems of the world into six families:
 Roman family
 German family
 Common law family
 Nordic family
 Family of the laws of the Far East (China and Japan)
 Religious family (Jewish, Muslim, and Hindu law)

Up to the second German edition of their introduction to comparative law, Zweigert and Kötz also used to mention Soviet or socialist law as another family of laws.

Glenn
H. Patrick Glenn proposed the classification of legal systems places national laws in the broader context of major legal tradition:
 Chthonic (or indigenous) law
 Talmudic law
 Islamic law
 Hindu law
 Confucianism law
 Civil law
 Common law

Professional associations
 American Association of Law Libraries
 American Society of Comparative Law
 International Association of Judicial Independence and World Peace
 International Association of Procedural Law
 International Law Association

Comparative law periodicals
 American Journal of Comparative Law
 German Law Journal
 Journal of Comparative Legislation and International Law
 The Journal of Comparative Law

See also
 Annual Bulletin of the Comparative Law Bureau (American Bar Association: 1908–1914, 1933), the first comparative law journal in the U.S.
 Comparative criminal justice
 Comparative law wiki, online wikis where jurists can complete questionnaires regarding their home legal system
 Friedrich Carl von Savigny (1779–1861) – a German legal scholar who wrote on comparative law
 List of national legal systems
 Rule according to higher law
 Rule of law

References

Notes

Citations

Sources 
Billis, Emmanouil. 'On the methodology of comparative criminal law research: Paradigmatic approaches to the research method of functional comparison and the heuristic device of ideal types', Maastricht Journal of European and Comparative Law 6 (2017): 864–881.
H Collins, 'Methods and Aims of Comparative Contract Law' (1989) 11 OJLS 396.
 Cotterrell, Roger (2006). Law, Culture and Society: Legal Ideas in the Mirror of Social Theory. Aldershot: Ashgate.
 De Cruz, Peter (2007) Comparative Law in a Changing World, 3rd edn (1st edn 1995). London: Routledge-Cavendish.
 Donahue, Charles (2008) 'Comparative Law before the "Code Napoléon"' in The Oxford Handbook of Comparative Law. Eds. Mathias Reimann & Reinhard Zimmermann. Oxford: Oxford University Press.
 Glanert, Simone (2008) 'Speaking Language to Law: The Case of Europe', Legal Studies 28: 161–171.
 Hamza, Gabor (1991). Comparative Law and Antiquity. Budapest: Akademiai Kiado.
 Husa, Jaakko. A New Introduction to Comparative Law. Oxford–Portland (Oregon): Hart, 2015.
O Kahn-Freund, 'Comparative Law as an Academic Subject' (1966) 82 LQR 40.
 Kischel, Uwe. Comparative Law. Trans. Andrew Hammel. Oxford: Oxford University Press, 2019.
 Legrand, Pierre (1996). 'European Legal Systems Are Not Converging', International and Comparative Law Quarterly 45: 52–81.
 Legrand, Pierre (1997). 'Against a European Civil Code', Modern Law Review 60: 44–63.
 Legrand, Pierre and Roderick Munday, eds. (2003). Comparative Legal Studies: Traditions and Transitions. Cambridge: Cambridge University Press.
 Legrand, Pierre (2003). 'The Same and the Different', in Comparative Legal Studies: Traditions and Transitions. Eds. Pierre Legrand & Roderick Munday. Cambridge: Cambridge University Press.
 Leibniz, Gottffried Wilhelm (2017) The New Method of Learning and Teaching Jurisprudence... Translation of the 1667 Frankfurt Edition. Clark, NJ: Talbot Publishing.
 Lundmark, Thomas, Charting the divide between common and civil law, Oxford University Press, 2012.
 MacDougal, M.S. 'The Comparative Study of Law for Policy Purposes: Value Clarification as an Instrument of Democratic World Order' (1952) 61 Yale Law Journal 915 (difficulties and requirements of good comparative law).
 .
 Menski Werner (2006) Comparative Law in a Global Context: the Legal Traditions of Asia and Africa. Cambridge: Cambridge University Press.
 Orucu, Esin and David Nelken, eds. Comparative Law: A Handbook. Oxford: Hart, 2007.
 Reimann, Mathias & Reinhard Zimmermann, eds. The Oxford Handbook of Comparative Law, 2nd edn. Oxford: Oxford University Press, 2019 (1st edn. 2008).
 Samuel, Geoffrey. An Introduction to Comparative Law Theory and Method. Oxford: Hart, 2014.
 Siems, Mathias. Comparative Law. Cambridge: Cambridge University Press, 2014.
 Watson, Alan. Legal Transplants: An Approach to Comparative Law, 2nd edn. University of Georgia Press, 1993.
 Zweigert, Konrad & Hein Kötz. An Introduction to Comparative Law, 3rd edn. Trans. Tony Weir. Oxford: Oxford University Press, 1998.
Legal systems
 .
 Glendon, Mary Ann, Paolo G. Carozza, & Colin B. Picker. Comparative Legal Traditions in a Nutshell, 4th edn. West Academic Publishing, 2015. 
 Glendon, Mary Ann, Paolo G. Carozza, & Colin B. Picker (2014). Comparative Legal Traditions: Text, Materials and Cases on Western Law, 4th edn. West Academic Publishing.
 Glenn, H. Patrick. Legal Traditions of the World, 5th edn. Oxford: Oxford University Press, 2014 (1st edn 2000).
Fields
 Bignami, Fracesca & David Zaring, eds. Comparative Law and Regulation: Understanding the Global Regulatory Process. Edward Elgar, 2018.
 Graziano, Thomas Kadner. Comparative Contract Law: Cases, Materials and Exercises, 2nd edn. Edward Elgar, 2019.
 Kozolchyk, Boris. Comparative Commercial Contracts: Law, Culture and Economic Development, 2nd edn. West Academic Publishing, 2018.
 Nelken, David, ed. Contrasting Criminal Justice: Getting from Here to There. Aldershot: Ashgate/Dartmouth, 2000.
 Roberts, Anthea et al., eds. Comparative International Law. Oxford: Oxford University Press, 2018.

External links
 Alan Watson Foundation
 Eason Weinmann Center for Comparative Law at Tulane University Law School
 European Union national law portal
 Global-Regulation search engine
 International Academy of Comparative Law 
 International Association of Constitutional Law
 International Constitutional Law 
 JuriGlobe
 Max Planck Institute for Comparative Public Law and International Law
 Oxford University Comparative Law Forum
 US Library of Congress Guide to Law Online: Nations
 US Library of Congress Global Law blog

 
Academic disciplines
Jurisprudence